Çamiçi (literally "inside the pine trees") is a Turkish place name that may refer to the following places in Turkey:

 Çamiçi, Gerger, a village in the district of Gerger, Adıyaman Province
 Çamiçi High Plateau, a plateau near the city of Niksar, Tokat Province